Sympistis aqualis is a moth of the  family Noctuidae first described by Augustus Radcliffe Grote in 1881. It is found in North America. It was formerly considered a subspecies of Oncocnemis riparia, but was elevated to species status and transferred to the genus Sympistis in 2008.

The wingspan is about 36 mm.

References

aqualis
Moths described in 1881